Fábio César Montezine (born 24 February 1979 in Londrina, Brazil) is a naturalized Qatari football player who is currently playing for Umm Salal in the Qatari league and for the Qatar national football team. As a junior, he played for the big Brazilian club São Paulo. He played a major part of his career in Italy, where he spent three years for Napoli. In 2005, he moved to Qatar to play for Al-Arabi. Fabio then became the playmaker of Umm Salal, with whom he reached the semi-finals of the AFC Champions League in 2009. Fabio later went on to play for Al-Rayyan for four seasons, during which he led his team to win the Emir Cup three times and the Heir Apparent Cup once.

International career
He became eligible to play for Qatar in 2008 and is a regular starter of the national team.

International goals

Citations

External links
 
 
 
 
 In-depth interview with Al Jazeera
 CBF 

1979 births
Living people
Brazilian emigrants to Qatar
Brazilian footballers
Qatari footballers
Qatar international footballers
Naturalised citizens of Qatar
Brazilian expatriate footballers
Sportspeople from Londrina
Santa Cruz Futebol Clube players
Czech First League players
FC Viktoria Plzeň players
Serie B players
Udinese Calcio players
S.S.C. Napoli players
U.S. Avellino 1912 players
Al-Rayyan SC players
Al-Arabi SC (Qatar) players
Umm Salal SC players
2011 AFC Asian Cup players
Qatar Stars League players
Expatriate footballers in the Czech Republic
Qatari people of Brazilian descent
Association football midfielders